Christian Thompson may refer to:

Christian Thompson (artist) (born 1978), Australian artist
Christian Thompson (American football) (born 1990), American football player
Christian Thompson, character in The Devil Wears Prada (film)
Christian Thompson, lead guitarist of Falling in Reverse

See also
Christian Thomsen (disambiguation)
 Chris Thompson (disambiguation)